Sinners in Summertime (Norwegian: Syndere i sommersol) is a 1934 Norwegian drama film directed by and starring  Einar Sissener. It also featured Tore Segelcke and Hans Jacob Nilsen and marked the debut of the future star of German cinema Kirsten Heiberg. It is based on the 1927 novel of the same title by Sigurd Hoel.

Cast
 Einar Sissener as Johan
 Tore Segelcke  as Erna
 Hans Jacob Nilsen  as Alf
 Hjørdis Bjarke  as Sigrid
 Georg Løkkeberg  as Erik
 Gøril Havrevold  as Randi
 Kirsten Heiberg  as Evelyn
 Andreas Bjarke  as Fredrik
 Lasse Segelcke  as Thomas F. Jensen
 Leif Omdal  as Peter Møllendorff
 Eva Steen  as En pasient

References

Bibliography 
 Ellen Rees. Cabins in Modern Norwegian Literature: Negotiating Place and Identity. Rowman & Littlefield, 2014.

External links 
 

1934 films
1934 drama films
Norwegian drama films
1930s Norwegian-language films
Films directed by Einar Sissener
Norwegian black-and-white films